This is a list of Australian admirals.

The following is an incomplete list of people who have attained admiral rank within the Royal Australian Navy (RAN).

Key

List
This list is sorted by surname.

Senior RAN appointments

See also
List of Australian generals and brigadiers
List of Royal Australian Air Force air marshals

Notes

Sources
Admirals of the RAN
 
RAN Admirals, www.navy.gov.au

Australia
Admirals
Admirals